Everything Sucks may refer to:

 Everything Sucks (Descendents album)
 Everything Sucks (Reel Big Fish album)
 Everything Sucks (Princess Nokia album)
 Everything Sucks!, 2018 Netflix TV series
 Everything Sucks, a book by Hannah Friedman
 "Everything Sucks", a song by Dope on the album Felons and Revolutionaries
 "Everything Sucks", a song by Simple Plan on the album Taking One for the Team
 "Everything Sucks (When You're Gone)", a song by MxPx on the album Before Everything & After